Hamid refers to two different but related Arabic given names, both of which come from the Arabic triconsonantal root of Ḥ-M-D (ِِح-م-د):

  (Arabic: حَامِد ḥāmid) also spelled Haamed, Hamid or Hamed, and in Turkish Hamit; it means "lauder" or "one who praises".
  (Arabic: حَمِيد ḥamīd) also spelled Hamid, or Hameed, in Turkish is Hamit, and in Azeri is Həmid or Һәмид; it means "lauded" or "praiseworthy".

Given name

Hamid
 Hamid Ahmadi (historian) (b. 1945), Iranian historian
 Hamid Ahmadi (futsal) (b. 1988), Iranian futsal player
 Hamid Ahmadieh, Iranian ophthalmologist and medical scientist
Hamid Al Shaeri, Egyptian-Libyan singer, songwriter, and musician 
Hamid Arasly, Azeri and Soviet scientist
Hamid Arzulu, Azerbaijani poet and writer
Hamid Berhili (born 1964), Moroccan boxer
Hamid Mahmood Butt, Pakistani ophthalmologist
Hamid Chitchian (born c. 1957), Iranian politician
Hamid Drake, American musician
Hamid Etemad, Iranian professor
Hamid Frangieh (1907–1981), Lebanese politician
Hamid Gabbay, Iranian-born American architect
Hamid Ghandehari, Iranian-American drug chemist 
Hamid Gul, Pakistani politician
Hamid Guska, head coach of Bosnian national boxing team
Hamid Hassani (born 1968), Iranian lexicographer
Hamid Ismailov, Uzbek journalist
Hamid Karzai, President of Afghanistan from 2002 to 2014
Hamid Hussain Musavi, Indian scholar
Hamid Notghi, Iranian Azeri poet, writer, author, university professor
Hamid Olimjon (1909–1944), Uzbek poet and scholar
Hamid Ekrem Šahinović, Bosnian writer and dramatist
Hamid Naderi Yeganeh, Iranian mathematical artist

Hamed / Hameed
Hamed Gohar, Egyptian oceanographer
Hamed Haddadi, Iranian basketball player
Hameed Haroon, Pakistani economist
Hamed Namouchi, Tunisian footballer
Hameed Nizami, Pakistani journalist
Hamed Rasouli, Iranian footballer
Hamed Sohrabnejad, Iranian basketball player
Hamed Traorè, Ivorian footballer

Middle name
Abed Hamed Mowhoush, Iraqi general
Awad Hamed al-Bandar, Iraqi chief judge
Mohammad Hamid Ansari (born 1937), vice-president of India

Surname

Alejandro Hamed, Paraguayan diplomat and Arabist
Amir Hamed, Uruguayan writer and translator
Amr Hamed, Canadian terrorist
Ezzedin Yacoub Hamed, Egyptian Long Jumper
Haseeb Hameed, English cricketer
Ibrahim Hamed, Hamas military commander
Mohsin Hamid (born 1971), Pakistani British author
Jasmin Hamid, Finnish actress
Mohamed Naguib Hamed, Egyptian athlete
Naseem Hamed, British boxer
Nima Arkani-Hamed, Canadian-American theoretical physicist
Rani Hamid (born 1944), Bangladeshi chess player
Sanaa Ismail Hamed, Egyptian model
Taha Bidaywi Hamed, Iraqi politician
 Yasmeen Hameed, Pakistani Urdu poet
Zid Abou Hamed, Australian athlete

See also
Abu Hamid Muhammad Ibn Muhammad Al-Ghazali Persian theologian, philosopher, jurist
Al Hamed, town in Egypt near Rosetta
 Hameed a village in Hazro Tehsil, Punjab, Pakistan
Abdul Hamid
Hamid al-Din (disambiguation)
Hamidids, 14th century Turkic dynasty
Hamit
Hamidah (disambiguation)

References

Arabic-language surnames
Arabic masculine given names
Bosniak masculine given names
Bosnian masculine given names
Iranian masculine given names
Pakistani masculine given names
Names of God in Islam